Willis Russell (1844 – July 1, 1875) was a Deputy United States Marshal who fought against William Smoot and his Ku Klux Klan chapter in Owen County, Kentucky. Smoot and his followers conducted a bloody reign of terror in Franklin (Frankfort), Owen County, and Henry Counties. Russell finally stopped them, though it cost him his life.

Early life

Willis Russell was born in 1844 in Monterey, Owen County, Kentucky, and grew up there. During the American Civil War, he served as horse soldier in John Hunt Morgan's famous Confederate cavalry.

Russell versus the Ku Klux Klan

Bill Smoot was a figure who was popular among the local politicians. He traveled in disguise with his father, John Smoot, and his brother, John C. Smoot, and was successful in recruiting new members to their Ku Klux Klan.

Bill Smoot's Ku Klux Klan were supported by local lawmen, newspapers, and the courts. Perry, the County Attorney, W. Monfort, the Commonwealth's Attorney, Judge Roberts, and the Police Judge of Owenton were either Klansmen themselves, or sympathetic to their cause. Secret Service documents prove that the Sheriff of Owen County was also a Klansman. Some claim that even Democratic Governors John White Stevenson and Governor Preston Hopkins Leslie were partial to Bill Smoot's Klan too.

William "Bill" Smoot Kills John B. Roberts

A man named Roberts was preparing for marriage when he was attacked and killed by a man named Salyers. Robert's father, John B. Roberts, became so overwrought by his son's death that when he saw Salyers entering a store, Roberts shot Salyers dead. Salyers was also preparing for his own marriage. John B. Roberts was later shot and killed at the village of Gratz in Owen County by William "Bill" Smoot.

1870

After many Klan led conflicts happened in Monterey and Guestville (Henry County) in 1870, Russell was assigned by the US Marshal service to investigate undercover. Russell, who posed a cashier of a country store in northern Owen County, was approached by four men (George Hoover, John Robinson, a man named Lockart, and Benjamin Moreland) who asked Russell to join the "Kuklux" to drive "the negroes" and "all Radicals who were in favor of negroes" from Kentucky. Russell declined. Later, these men came to Russell's store and bought some sheets for their gowns and hoods. They then set out to reclaim the homes and property of the negroes in Stamping Ground, Scott County, since they had ignored a warning to leave the area. During the raid, the Klansmen shot and killed one old negro and wounded several others. One of the negroes fired back, killing one of the klansmen, whose body was found in a ditch next to the road. He was identified as a man named Foree, a school teacher who lived near Harper's Ferry, in Henry County.

Afterwards, John White Stevenson, Kentucky's 25th Governor (1867 – February 13, 1871), and a former Confederate sympathizer, authorized Russell to form his own militia to fight the Klansmen, though he later abandoned the idea.

1872

In the spring of 1872, Russell moved to Gratz, an Owen County town on the Kentucky River.

In the winter of 1872, Smoot's Klan rode up to Russell's new home in Gratz late one night, armed, mounted, and disguised. They demanded that Russell come out. Russell recognized John Onan's voice and hid indoors. When Russell wouldn't come out, the Klansmen left. Several citizens of Gratz came out to see what was going on, and the Klansmen fired at them, but missed.

Shortly after that, Bill Smoot's Ku Klux Klan attacked Jordan Mosby and his son, who lived in a cabin on W. M. Bourne's farm in Henry County. Mosby's son was shot, the bullet paralyzing him for of life. Even though Mosby recognized the Klansmen, but none of them were ever arrested.

1873

Early in 1873, the Smoot's men attacked the home of a 70-year-old Richard E. Williams in Guestville, in Henry County.  Willaims was wounded in the arm, but he managed to fight them off. He had even managed to wounding Bill Smoot himself, though not mortally.

When Williams recovered, he went to Frankfort and appealed to Governor Preston Leslie, the 26th Governor of Kentucky (February 13, 1871 – August 31, 1875), also a Confederate sympathizer, for assistance. Leslie offered a reward for the capture of those who attacked Williams. One of those implicated was Harvie Grubbs. Russell immediately went out to arrest Grubbs, but Bill Smoot was there, and he ordered Grubbs not to go along with Russell, until Russell stood in between Grubbs and Smoot, pulled his pistol, and forced Grubbs to go.

That night, Bill Smoot gathered 20 men, armed with shotguns and pistols, and followed Russell to Newcastle, intent on murdering Russell and the two young men Russell had employed as guards. On the way to Newcastle, one of Russell's horses went lame, and so Russell asked Lewis Wilson, a local Black citizen, to loan them his horse which he did, which sealed Wilson's doom. Russell was able to get to Newcastle, put Grubbs in jail, and left before Smoot could catch him. Russell then went to Eminence expecting to take the first train to Frankfort. Smoot, however, arrived at Eminence just moments after Russell did. The town marshal told Russell to stay in his hotel. The Marshal sent Russell's horses out to Frankfort Road, after dark, and Russell and his two guards slipped out, got on their horses, and rode them to Frankfort that night.

Russell contacted Preston Leslie about his ordeal, but Leslie said there wasn't anything he could do for Russell, because "the Legislature had virtually tied his hands". Leslie reassured Russell that he wouldn't be harassed for arresting Harvie Grubbs, but this proved to be false. Russell left Frankfort, and while on his road to his Monterey home, Smoot and his Klan party came out on the road, after Russell passed them, expecting to catch Russell. After seeing their ambush fail, Smoot told them that he intended murder Russell and his two guards for the arrest of Grubbs. Shortly afterwards, Grubbs was released from jail, and was never prosecuted for his participation in the shooting of Richard E. Williams.

In July 1873, the Ku Klux Klan murdered a colored man named Lewis Wilson. Wilson, a Black man, resided on the farm of the widow of Mason Brown in Owen County, two miles from Gratz. The Klan, 17 participants, went to Wilson's house in the middle of the night, broke open his door, and shot him dead. After murdering Lewis Wilson, the Klan then burned his house to the ground. Wilson, as he lay dying, told his neighbor the names of several of the party whom he had recognized.

The Courier-Journal reported in August 1873 that there had been at least 88 raids conducted by the Klan in less than a year. A Courier-Journal correspondent was sent to Owen County, who informed Russell that Governor Leslie had offered a $500 reward for each of the 17 men implicated. An 18-year-old who was a part of Smoot's raid on Lewis Wilson confessed to Russell that he a member of Smoot's gang, and gave Russell 17 names. Russell arrested one of the men implicated by the 18-year-old informant, and he too made a confession, giving the same names. Judge Roberts, the County Judge of Owen County, signed an affidavit to have 13 of the 17 names given, arrested.

The next day, after getting the affidavits of 13 of the local Klansmen, Russell arrested three of them, and put them in the Owenton jail. When the other Klansmen heard that Russell had already arrested 3, they ran and hid out in the woods. Three of them were taken to Indiana by Bill Smoot. Governor Preston gave Russell permission to cross state lines to go after them.

Willis Russell caught up with Bill Smoot's gang and arrested John Onan in Smoot's presence. Russell took Onan to Judge Roberts, who confessed that he was a part of the gang that murdered Lewis Wilson, and gave up three more names of men who rode with Bill Smoot.

The next day, Russell arrested Henry Triplett, who also confessed. He reaffirmed the names Onan had given by giving the same names.

Onan was tried for murder in November 1873. Onan had confessed to the crime, two former gang members turned State's evidence, and two other witnesses testified that Onan had confessed to the crime. John Onan didn't even introduce any evidence on his own behalf. But through the contrivance of the County Judge and the County Attorney, Onan was acquitted.

Russell's 18-year-old informant warned Russell of another of Smoot's planned raids on the Black residents of Twin Creek in Owen County. After seeing Russell's men organized in Twin Creek, the Klan scurried away, never carrying out their attack on that town. On a Tuesday, the informant said that the Klan was planning on killing William Plasters and Willis Russell next, on Thursday, and then go to Brown's Bottom, and kill all the Blacks there. Plasters was able to leave his home, but the Klan tore up everything in his house. The citizens of Gratz were ready for the Klan, so Smoot never went there. Instead, he went to Owenton, and told one of the Walkers at his hotel that if Russell didn't stop arresting Klansmen, then Russell would be hung from the highest tree in the county. Russell sent word that he planned on arresting every single one of the outlaws.

Willis Russell, US Marshal, 1874

Early in 1874, a large band of Smoot's Klan was organized on Twin Creek near Gratz, and Russell contacted General Eli H. Murray in Louisville. Willis Russell was then officially deputized as a United States Marshal by General Eli H. Murray. After Russell was deputized as a US Marshall, Bill Smoot vowed publicly that he would not rest until he had run Russell and the Walkers out of Owen County. Local authorities did nothing to restrain Smoot and his gang.

Sensing that he had enough witnesses ready to testify against the Henry and Owen County Klan, Russell requested a squad of soldiers, which both the state and federal governments gave to him. Then Russell began arresting them all. Russell arrested Jim Oskins, John Onan, Billy Walston, William Razor, Fielding Douthitt, Reuben Clements, Joseph Hoskins, and William Smoot in February 1874. Russell put these eight culprits in a boat to put them in the Louisville jail (since some had escaped the Owenton jail previously). On the way to Louisville, William Smoot was able to escape. The other prisoners all posted bond to insure their appearance at the October term of the United States District Court in Louisville, and were released.

Bluford Woods, a man who had turned state's evidence at John Onan's trial, came up missing. Russell assumed he had been murdered, since nobody had heard any news about his whereabouts.

Bill and John C. Smoot Kill James M. Walker

Believing that law and order had been restored in Owen County, the federal troops left on May 3, 1874. Then, on May 4, the next day, on a late rainy Monday afternoon, Bill Smoot and his brother John C. Smoot shot James M. Walker in the back in the main street in Owenton, Kentucky. James was walking to his brother William's Walker Hotel, and was shot down from two rifles in the upper windows of the Hill Hotel. James dropped dead immediately.

After murdering James M. Walker, about 40 Klan members started yelling all over town. The Klansmen then literally riddled his dead body with many bullets blasting out of their rifles and pistols. Some of the Klan brazenly shot James' dead body from the courthouse lawn. Although the Sheriff was in town with three of his deputies, the Smoots and their men reloaded their pistols and leisurely walked out of Owenton. The Town Marshal tried to arrest Smoot, but they threatened his life, and so he backed down.

James, 31, had three children, and a wife, Alice Grover Walker, at home. It was Alice and James' 8th anniversary. Alice buried her husband on her father's farm. James and William's brother, F. R. ("Dock") Walker, was severely wounded in the arm. The federal troops came back, but they couldn't find Smoot or any of his men, who were presumably hiding in the mountainous forests of Owen County.

On July 1, again, the federal troops left Owen County. Smoot's Ku Klux Klan became more emboldened, and they made a raid on an old man named Hayden living at Elkhorn. Two months later, at a Masonic barbecue given in Monterey, Green Barr, a Klan member, slipped up behind Charles Walker, one of James' brothers, and tried to shoot him in the back, but wasn't able to because of the timely interference of Thomas Walker. William H. Walker's life was threatened, and so he sold his hotel in Owenton, and prepared to move away. On election day, Green Barr came to Monterey. While hiding in the woods, he shot at Henry Triplett, who had testified against the Klan members for Russell in US District Court. Green Barr later accused Russell of threatening to murder him, and so he swore out a warrant against Russell and Henry Triplett. Russell showed up for the court case, but none of the prosecuting witnesses came. The court date was postponed until August 22.

On Saturday, August 22, the day set for the trial of Barr and Triplett, Barr sent Russell word through the Owen County Constable that he was coming to town with a hundred men.

15 to 20 more armed men of the Klan marched towards Monterey behind Perry. Green Barr, one of the Smoots, Simon Margoyles, and George T. Mefford were all a part of the incoming gang. Russell went to see Tom and Charles Walker at Tucker's Hotel. Then the three men started to walk towards Russell's house, where most of his guards were stationed. When the Walkers and Russell passed Hardin's store, they saw George T. Mefford standing nearby with his hand on his pistol. When Russell and the Walkers got to the corner of the store, Mefford pulled his pistol, and both of the Walker boys fired. Mefford ran, and as Russell pursued him, William Hall, one of the gang members, shot at Russel. After the shootout, Mefford mounted his horse, following behind another, and left Monterey, riding in the direction of the Klan along the road between Monterey and Owenton.

Perry, the County Attorney who rode with the Klansmen, accused one of Russell's men of shooting at him. Russell got affidavits from several citizens disproving Perry's claims. On his return to Owenton, Perry swore out writs for Russell, the two Walker boys, and others. George T. Mefford swore out a warrant against Willis Russell, Thomas M. Walker, William Graves, Charles Walker, and John Wilson for attempting to kill Mefford. Perry also issued a warrant for Willis Russell, Thomas M. Walker, Charles Walker, James Russell, Thomas Wilson, John Wilson, William Graves and Henry Triplett for the shooting that occurred on August 10, 1874. John Smoot, Bill's father, was shot, and John C. Smoot, Bill's brother was killed. John Smoot said that he "saw the two Walkers, Willis Russell and a man named Wilson all fire upon me. I do not know who hit me, but they all fired. I saw them clearly; they were not further off than from this bed to that wall."

Perry, the County Attorney, was able to get the Grand Jury to successfully indict all of those accused. The Police Judge of Owenton who issued those writs was himself a Klansman. Before the Sheriff came to arrest Russell and company, Bill Smoot ordered Perry to request the state's militia from Governor Preston Leslie to settle a "state of riot and rebellion." At the same time, Russell asked the federal marshal to send troops to see that he got a fair trial.

Mini-civil war averted

The Sheriff of Owen County confronted Russell, saying that he had a warrant out for his arrest. Russell showed him his credentials as a United States Marshal, but the Sheriff refused to recognize them. Russell refused to surrender to him because he knew that would be suicide. The next day the Sheriff came with a posse of over thirty men, most of whom who had no authority. At least twenty-five of the Sheriff's men were known by him to be Ku Klux Klan members. The Klansmen were as follows: Mose Webster, with six men; William and Jim Hoskins, with sixteen men; Jim Hoskins, who was under indictment in Federal court for Klan activities, with five or six men; Bill Smoot, with eighteen or twenty men, who was under federal indictment his clan activities, and before the Owen Circuit Court for the murder of James M. Walker; and Dick New, with 20 men. Many of the men with the Sheriff hadn't been in Owen County for more than a year.

The State's troops arrived at about the same time as the Sheriff's (mostly Klan) posse did. While the State's troops said they intended to arrest all those involved, they didn't arrest Smoot or Hoskins or their men. There were over a hundred men chasing Russell, until General Eli H. Murray's federal troops arrived just in the nick of time.

In a letter penned from Russell to Murray, he wrote:

October 1874

In October 1874, a federal grand jury indicted several Klansmen, but then dismissed all charges against them when every prosecution witness disappeared. They probably had been murdered by the Klan.

Raids by the Klan resumed immediately. Toward the end of October, a mob invaded eastern Shelby County, whipped three Black men, and threatened their employer, Thomas Ford, with violence if he persisted in hiring black workers. That same month, Klansmen murdered a teenage black girl and whipped several field hands.

1875

Klanmen burned a black church in Todd County on February 16, 1875.

In June 1875, the State of Kentucky shelled out thousands of dollars in a court case against Russell. GC Wharton signed a $2,000 check for Alexander and Dickinson, the lawyers who were prosecuting the case of "Commonwealth versus Willis Russell, et al". More checks were signed for witnesses against Russell, traveling expenses for JH Dorman, who provided "services" for the Commonwealth, and newspaper men (for the Louisville Commercial, and Graham and Hardacre) were also paid by the State of Kentucky.

Assassination

On July 1, 1875, Deputy U.S. Marshal Willis Russell was murdered late at night by an assassin who fired a load of buckshot through the window as Russell was sitting in his home.

Aftermath

A member of the Klan, John W. Brothers, was arrested and turned State's evidence by telling on everybody else involved in Klan activity. A dozen of the Klan members had warrants issued against them, but only four—Bill Smoot, John Onan, Meffert, and A. W. Hall—were captured.

The four Klansmen finally faced trial in November 1875. They were found guilty of conspiring against the government by intimidating United States Marshall Willis Russell, but were not found guilty not of his murder. When sentencing the men, Judge Emmons was apologetic, because even though a jury had found them guilty, Emmons believed they were honest law-abiding citizens. On November 13, 1875, Judge Emmons sentenced Bill Smoot to five years in the penitentiary in Frankfort. Onan received three years. Meffert escaped prison time on the grounds that he had been injured while pursuing the marshal. A. W. Hall was found not guilty. Klan raids continued in Kentucky through December 1875.

Tom Walker testified against Smoot, and after the trial, moved out west, became wealthy, and died an old man.

On March 3, 1877, President Ulysses S. Grant pardoned W.F. Smoot, Simon Margolyes, and Davis Cox. Smoot served less than a year and a half of his five-year prison sentence.

References

People from Owen County, Kentucky
United States Marshals
1875 deaths
African-American history of Kentucky
Hate crime
History of racial segregation in the United States
History of racism in Kentucky
Ku Klux Klan
Lynching in the United States
Presidency of Ulysses S. Grant
Racially motivated violence against African Americans
People of the Reconstruction Era
Religiously motivated violence in the United States
Neo-Confederates
1844 births